Nathaniel Garcia (born 24 April 1993) is a Trinidadian professional football player who plays as a midfielder for Martyr's Memorial A-Division League team Friends Club and Trinidad and Tobago national football team.

Career

Gokulam Kerala
In September 2019, Nathaniel Garcia signed for Indian I-League club Gokulam Kerala.

NEROCA
In November 2020, Nathaniel Garcia signed for Indian I-League club NEROCA.

Friends Club
García scored 4 goals for Nepali side Friends Club in the 2021 Martyr's Memorial A-Division League.

Career statistics

Club
Statistics accurate as of 24 August 2019

Honours 
Central FC
 TT Pro League: 2014–15

References

External links 
 

Living people
TT Pro League players
Trinidad and Tobago footballers
Central F.C. players
I-League players
Gokulam Kerala FC players
T&TEC Sports Club players
Association football midfielders
1993 births
Trinidad and Tobago international footballers
Footballers at the 2015 Pan American Games